Mark Brooks (born May 7, 1970) is an American producer, director, writer and musician known for his work on projects such as Metalocalypse, Moonbeam City and Serenity. He is a member of the dark electronic pop group Night Club.

Early life
Brooks was born and raised in Denver, Colorado.  Using the pseudonym 3 Kord Scissor King, Brooks co-founded and played guitar for the influential punk band Warlock Pinchers while still in high school. The group disbanded in early 1992 when Brooks was 22 During college Brooks co-founded the band Foreskin 500 with Diggie Diamond in the mid-1990s. Initially just a duo with Diamond on vocals and Brooks playing everything else, the group eventually rounded out its lineup with Dave Kerr and Dave Moore.

Directing career
In 1999, Brooks began his animation career in Los Angeles, co-founding the animation studio Gifted Men Productions. It was here where he co-created the animated shows "Lil' Pimp", "Creamburg" as well as directing The Slim Shady Show starring Eminem.   Lil Pimp would go on to become a feature film produced by Revolution Studios/Sony Pictures co-written and directed by Brooks.  The film featured Brooks in the lead role alongside William Shatner, Bernie Mac, Ludacris, and Lil' Kim.  After Lil' Pimp was completed, Brooks began writing/directing TV shows such as Metalocalypse, Black Panther" and Moonbeam City.

Music career
In 2012, Brooks formed the dark electronic pop band Night Club with Emily Kavanaugh.  In 2017, Brooks produced and co-wrote "Tears in the Rain", "Wild Roses", "Edge of the Blade", "528hz" and "432hz" with electronic cholo-goth duo, Prayers  for their Baptism of Thieves LP.  Brooks' music has been featured in such films and television shows as The Fan, Mad Money, Blonde Ambition, "Las Vegas", and The Riches.

Filmography
Feature film
 Lil Pimp – director, writer
 Serenity – Director for "Fruity Oaty Bar" sequence.
 Baton – Animation director 

Television
 Metalocalypse (2006–13) – director, storyboards, writer
 Metalocalypse: The Doomstar Requiem (2013) – story, director, editing
 Black Panther (2010) – director
 Moonbeam City (2015) – episode director
 Little Big Awesome (2016–18) – supervising director, episode director
 Momma Named Me Sheriff'' (2019) – episode director, season 1

Music videos

 Black Breath - "Home of the Grave"<ref name="metalunderground1"
 Burning Brides - "Love Sick"
 Danzig - "Danzig Legacy"
 Dethklok - "Castratikron"
 Dethklok - "Dethharmonic"
 Dethklok - "I Ejaculate Fire"
 Melvins - "Electric Flower"
 Melvins - "The War on Wisdom"
 Slayer - "Playing With Dolls"
 Slayer - "World Painted Blood"

References

External links
 

Living people
American film directors
American male writers
American music video directors
American keyboardists
1970 births